Dorothea, also spelt Dorothee (German), Dorothée (French), and Dorotea, is a female given name from Greek  (Dōrothéa) meaning "god's gift". In English it more commonly spelt Dorothy.

People with this name include:

Aristocracy 
 Countess Palatine Dorothea Sophie of Neuburg (1670–1748), Duchess of Parma
 Dorotea Gonzaga (1449–1468), duchess consort of Milan
 Dorothea, Abbess of Quedlinburg (1591-1617), Princess-Abbess of Quedlinburg
 Dorothea Friederike of Brandenburg-Ansbach (1676–1731), last Countess of Hanau
 Dorothea Hedwig of Brunswick-Wolfenbüttel (1587–1609), princess of Brunswick-Wolfenbüttel, and Princess of Anhalt-Zerbst by marriage
 Dorothea Maria of Anhalt (1574–1617), Duchess of Saxe-Weimar
 Dorothea Maria of Saxe-Gotha-Altenburg (1654–1682), German princess
 Dorothea Marie of Saxe-Gotha-Altenburg (1674–1713), Duchess of Saxe-Meiningen
 Dorothea of Anhalt-Zerbst (1607–1634), princess of Anhalt-Zerbst
 Dorothea of Brandenburg (disambiguation)
 Dorothea of Bulgaria (fl. 1370–1390), Queen of Bosnia
 Dorothea of Denmark (disambiguation)
 Dorothea of Saxe-Lauenburg (1511–1571), queen consort of Christian III, King of Denmark and Norway
 Dorothea of Saxony (1563–1587), Saxon princess
 Dorothea Sophia, Abbess of Quedlinburg (1587–1645)
 Dorothea Susanne of Simmern (1544–1592), princess of the Electoral Palatinate, Duchess of Saxe-Weimar by marriage
 Margravine Dorothea Charlotte of Brandenburg-Ansbach (1661–1705), Countess of Hesse-Darmstadt
 Princess Dorothea of Courland (1793–1862), Baltic German noblewoman
 Princess Dorothea of Saxe-Coburg and Gotha (1881–1967)
 Princess Dorothea of Schleswig-Holstein-Sonderburg-Beck (1685–1761), Margravine of Brandenburg-Bayreuth-Kulmbach by marriage

Saints 
 Dorothea of Alexandria (fl. 320), martyr
 Dorothea of Caesarea (fl. 311), martyr, patron saint of florists
 Dorothea of Montau (1347–1394), Roman Catholic saint, hermitess and visionary

Other people

First name
 Dorotea Bucca (1360–1436), Italian physician
 Dorotea van Fornenbergh (fl. 1647–1697), Dutch stage actress
 Dorothea Binz (1920–1947), German concentration camp officer executed for war crimes
 Dorothea Brooking (1916–1999), British children's television producer and director
 Dorothea Dix (1802–1887), American social activist
 Dorothea Douglass Lambert Chambers (1878–1960), English tennis player
 Dorothea Dunckel (1799–1878), Swedish playwright
 Dorothea Erxleben (1715–1762), first woman doctor in Germany
 Dorothea Fairbridge (1860–1931), South African novelist
 Dorothea Gerard (1855–1915), Scottish novelist
 Dorothea Hoffman (d. 1710), Swedish hat maker
 Dorothea Barth Jörgensen (born 1990), Swedish fashion model
 Dorothea Jordan (1761–1816), Irish actress and mistress of the future King William IV of the United Kingdom
 Dorothea Kalpakidou (born 1983), Greek discus thrower
 Dorothea Krag (1675–1754), Danish postmaster
 Dorothea Lange (1895–1965), American documentary photographer and photojournalist
 Dorothea Lasky (born 1978), American poet
 Dorothea Mackellar (1885–1968), Australian poet and writer
 Dorothea Macnee (1896–1984) British socialite and mother of Patrick Macnee
 Dorothea Maria Lösch (1730–1799), Swedish marine captain
 Dorothea Nelson (1903-1994), American librarian
 Dorothea Ostrelska (fl. 1577) Swedish court dwarf
 Dorothea Puente (1929–2011), American serial killer
 Dorothea Röschmann (born 1967), German soprano
 Dorothea Tanning (1910–2012), American painter, printmaker, sculptor and writer
 Dorothea Viehmann (1755–1816), German storyteller
 Dorothea Waddingham (1899–1936),  English murderer
 Dorothea Wierer (born 1990), Italian biathlete
 Dorothea Wyss (–after 1487) married Niklaus von Flüe, the patron saint of Switzerland
 Dorothee Bär (born 1968), German politician of the Christian Social Union of Bavaria (CSU)
 Dorothee Hess-Maier, semi-retired German publisher
 Dorothee Kern (born 1966), German biochemist and academic, former basketball player for the East German team
 Dorothee Mields (born 1971), German soprano concert singer
 Dorothee Sölle (1929–2003), German liberation theologian
 Dorothee Stapelfeldt (born 1956), German politician of the Social Democratic Party (SPD)

Middle name
 Johanna Dorothea Lindenaer (1664–1737), Dutch writer
 Angela Dorothea Merkel (born 1954), former Chancellor of Germany
 Christina Doreothea Stuart (fl. 1774), Norwegian artist

Single name
 Dorothée (born 1953) French singer and television presenter

Fictional characters

 Dorotea, woman discovered in the Sierra Morena by Cardenio in Miguel de Cervantes' novel Don Quixote
 Dorothea, the subject of the song of the same name by Taylor Swift
 Dorothea Arnault, a character from the video game Fire Emblem: Three Houses
 Dorotea Benedetti, a character from the novel Pattern Recognition
 Dorothea Brooke, the heroine in the novel Middlemarch

See also 
 Doda (singer), (born Dorota Rabczewska; 1984), Polish singer-songwriter and actress
 Dorota Nieznalska (born 1973), Polish artist
 Dorothea (disambiguation)
 Dorothy (given name)
 Thea (name)
 Tea (given name)

References

German feminine given names
Dutch feminine given names
Theophoric names